Admiral Sir Arthur Fanshawe  (5 February 1794 – 14 June 1864) was a Royal Navy officer who went on to be Commander-in-Chief, Plymouth.

Naval career
Born the son of Robert Fanshawe, Fanshawe joined the Royal Navy in 1804. Promoted to Captain in 1816, he commanded HMS Donegal from 1832 and then HMS Princess Charlotte during the Oriental Crisis in 1840.

Fanshawe was appointed Commodore, West Coast of Africa in 1849, Commander-in-chief, North America and West Indies in 1853 and Commander-in-Chief, Mediterranean Fleet in 1858.  His last appointment was as Commander-in-Chief, Plymouth from June 1860.

Fanshawe died at Regent's Park in London and left his estates in Hampshire to his nephew, Admiral Sir Edward Fanshawe.

See also

References

|-

|-

1794 births
1864 deaths
Royal Navy admirals
Knights Commander of the Order of the Bath
Burials at Kensal Green Cemetery
Fanshawe family